Scott Glacier may refer to any of these glaciers:

 Scott Glacier (Alaska), a glacier in the Chugach Mountains, near Cordova, Alaska
 Scott Glacier (Transantarctic Mountains), a major glacier flowing from the East Antarctic Ice Sheet through the Queen Maud subrange of the Transantarctic Mountains into the Ross Ice Shelf
 Scott Glacier (East Antarctica), a glacier on the outer coast of East Antarctica